Vegan Friendly, formerly the Association for the Vegan Future, is an Israeli organization founded in September 2012 by Omri Paz, an advocate of veganism and animal rights.

Vegan Friendly Label

Business Marketing 
The Vegan Friendly Label was designed to highlight vegan-friendly restaurants and businesses in Israel, making veganism accessible for those who choose to make the transition or want to experience veganism. 

Today, the association has more than 1,000 restaurants and over 2,500 food businesses that are Vegan Friendly, including leading coffee shop chains and restaurants with several branches nationwide. 

The association has also worked to include a category for Vegan Friendly restaurants in all the leading indexes of restaurants and online delivery services, in order to make veganism accessible to the general population as well.

Product Marketing 
In February 2013, the association began the national product labeling project. As part of this project, the association marks vegan food, grooming and clothing products with the label "Vegan Friendly" in large marketing chains and various companies in the Israeli market. As part of the marketing, the association conducts strict tests of the  products' components to make sure that they are actually vegan. Currently, there are over 700 different companies in the market that have more than 8,000 Vegan Friendly labeled products nationwide.

As part of the marketing, the association maintains collaborations with food chains and large businesses, providing advice on how to become vegan friendly and more.

Projects 
Among the projects are Vegan Fest, the Vegan Congress, and Vegan Active Club.

In September 2021, the association launched the first advertisement on veganism in Israel's prime time, "Fresh Fresh". It was estimated that one in three Israelis saw the advertisement and tens of thousands from all over the world indicated that they would switch to veganism and vegetarianism.

With the participation of Rotem Sela, an informational video was made which deals with the ethical issues of the dairy industry. This project was watched by about a million Israelis and caused thousands of people to change their consumption habits.

In August 2022, the association sponsored Hapoel Tel Aviv in basketball.

References

Animal welfare organizations based in Israel
Animal rights organizations
Veganism